The 1930–31 season was the 50th season in the history of Nelson Football Club, and their tenth and final as a member of The Football League. As they had done in 1927–28, the team finished bottom of the Third Division North, with a record of 6 wins, 7 draws and 29 defeats giving them a total of 19 points. As a result, Nelson were forced to apply for re-election to the League. The application was not successful; in a recount following a tied vote, Chester received one more vote than Nelson and subsequently took their place in the Third Division North for the 1931–32 season. Nelson were poor throughout the season, and lost all 22 league and cup matches away from home. They fell to the bottom of the table on 26 December 1930 and remained there until the end of the season. The 0–4 defeat away at Hull City on 2 May 1931 was to be their last match in the Football League.

Nelson also entered the 1930–31 FA Cup, and reached the Second Round for the second time in their history. After defeating North Eastern League side Workington in the First Round, Nelson were knocked out by York City following a replay. The team's top goalscorer was Leslie Raisbeck, a new signing from Stockport County, who scored a total of 15 goals in all competitions. The average attendance at Seedhill was just over 2,400, by far the lowest average during Nelson's spell in the Football League.

Football League

Key
H = Home match
A = Away match
In Result column, Nelson's score shown first

Match results

FA Cup

Match results

Player statistics
Key to positions

CF = Centre forward
FB = Fullback
GK = Goalkeeper

HB = Half-back
IF = Inside forward
OF = Outside forward

Statistics

See also
List of Nelson F.C. seasons

References

Nelson F.C. seasons
Nelson